Jinogondolella is an extinct genus of conodonts.

Use in stratigraphy 
The top of the Kungurian (the base of the Roadian and the Guadalupian series) is defined as the place in the stratigraphic record where fossils of the species Jinogondolella nanginkensis first appeared.

The base of the Capitanian stage is defined as the place in the stratigraphic record where fossils of the species Jinogondolella postserrata first appeared. The global reference profile for this stratigraphic boundary is located at Nipple Hill in the southern Guadalupe Mountains of Texas.

The base of the Wordian stage is defined as the place in the stratigraphic record where fossils of the species Jinogondolella aserrata first appeared. The global reference profile for this stratigraphic boundary is located at Getaway Ledge in the Guadalupe Mountains of Texas.

References

External links 

 

Ozarkodinida genera
Permian conodonts
Guadalupian life
Cisuralian first appearances
Guadalupian genus extinctions